Josef Brumlík (born 19 October 1911, date of death unknown) was a Czech weightlifter. He competed in the men's light heavyweight event at the 1936 Summer Olympics.

References

External links
 

1911 births
Year of death missing
Czech male weightlifters
Olympic weightlifters of Czechoslovakia
Weightlifters at the 1936 Summer Olympics
Place of birth missing